Tairo may refer to:

Tairō, high-ranking official position in the bakuhan taisei government of Japan
Taïro (born 1978), French singer of dancehall and reggae

See also
Tairov (disambiguation)